Christophe Léotard (born 1966, in Amiens) is a French correspondence chess grandmaster and the 19th World Champion in Correspondence Chess. He obtained 8.5 points (+5 =7) in the championship (a category XV tournament), which started on 20 April 2004.

External links
Interview with Léotard (in French)

Living people
World Correspondence Chess Champions
Correspondence chess grandmasters
French chess players
1966 births
Sportspeople from Amiens